was a Japanese video game publisher and video distributor. The games published were mostly focused on the Japanese market although a few titles have been published abroad. In October 1996, the company was merged with the video game division of Victor Entertainment and became Victor Interactive Software.

Videos
Satsujin Kippu wa Heart-iro
Dokudami Tenement
Ninja Ryukenden
Humanoid Monster Bem
Love Potion: Halley Densetsu
Record of Lodoss War: Special Edition
The Laughing Salesman

Games

References

Amusement companies of Japan
Defunct video game companies of Japan
Video game development companies
Video game publishers